Blazing Love is a 1916 American silent drama film directed by Kenean Buel and starring Virginia Pearson and Louise Huff.

Cast
 Virginia Pearson as Margaret Walsh 
 Louise Huff as Jeanne Clark 
 Frank Burbeck as Morgan Delafield 
 Mattie Ferguson as Mammy 
 Frank Goldsmith as Russell Barridan 
 John Merkyl as Stephen Bond 
 George Selby as Arthur Graham 
 Louis Stern as Charles Walsh

References

Bibliography
 Solomon, Aubrey. The Fox Film Corporation, 1915-1935: A History and Filmography. McFarland, 2011.

External links
 

1916 films
1916 drama films
1910s English-language films
American silent feature films
Silent American drama films
Films directed by Kenean Buel
American black-and-white films
Fox Film films
1910s American films